Lianna Klassen is a Canadian Christian Celtic and Christian New Age-influenced musician, songwriter, speaker and worship leader. A Juno Award nominee and GMA Canada Covenant Award winner, Klassen has released seven albums to date.  Her compositions are chants, hymns and meditations on the themes of praise, prayer and worship. Stylistically they have also included Christmas carols, contemporary praise, country music and Christian folk. Notable songs written by Lianna include: "Song for Canada", "I will Not Be Silent" and "Song of Declaration."

Klassen was born on August 25, 1961, in Vancouver, British Columbia and has been based out of Abbotsford, British Columbia, Calgary, Alberta, and most recently, Montreal, Quebec. Lianna was a worship leader at Northview Community Church in Abbotsford for several years. She wrote her first gospel song at the age of 14 and has been performing since the age of eight. Klassen is married and has three children. Her son Jordan Klassen is a singer-songwriter.

Discography

Songs on compilations

 Window of Hope, "Song of Declaration", "Doors and Windows", "Listen to the Sound" & "Salvation" (Gospel Music Foundation, 2002)
 Sea to Sea: I See The Cross, "You Are God And You Are Wonderful" (CMC, 2005)
 Sea to Sea: The Voice of Creation, "Celtic Blessings: You Are The Peace" (CMC, 2007)
 Sea to Sea: Christmas, "Huron Carol" (Lakeside, 2009)

Notable appearances 

 duet with Graham Ord on: "Like Joshua of old", on his album: Regarding the Maker (Knewsense Records, 2005)

Awards and recognition 
GMA Canada Covenant Awards
 2001 Contemporary Gospel Album of the Year: Love In the Ruins, Hope In the Wasteland
 2001 Inspirational Song of the Year: "Song for Canada"
 2005 nominee, Inspirational Album of the Year: Out of Borderland
 2007 nominee, Folk/Roots Song of the Year: "Celtic Blessing"
 2007 nominee, Inspirational Song of the Year: "I Am"
 2007 nominee, Instrumental Song of the Year: "Repentance Lament"
 2007 nominee, Folk/Roots Album of the Year: The Guest
 2007 nominee, Album of the Year: The Guest
 2011 Inspirational Album of the Year: Songs For The Journey – The Story Goes On...

Juno Awards
 1999 nominee, Best Gospel Album: Listen to the Sound

Shai Awards (formerly The Vibe Awards)
 2002 nominee, Female Vocalist of the Year
 2002 nominee, Contemporary/Pop Album Of The Year: Love In the Ruins, Hope In the Wasteland
 2002 nominee, Worship Album of the Year: Love In the Ruins, Hope In the Wasteland
 2002 nominee, Song of the Year: "Song for Canada"
 2003 nominee, Female Vocalist of the Year
 2003 nominee, Inspirational Album Of The Year: Once Upon A Time Forever After
 2004 Seasonal Album Of The Year: Once Upon a Time Forever After
 2004 nominee, Female Soloist of the Year
 2004 nominee, Song of the Year: "The Women's Song"
 2005 nominee, Female Vocalist of the Year
 2005 nominee, Inspirational Album of the Year: Out of Borderland

References

External links 
  Lianna Klassen's Official German home page. Retrieved 2008-11-01.
 Lianna Klassen's MySpace. Retrieved 2008-10-18.

Living people
1961 births
Musicians from Vancouver
Canadian Christians
Canadian folk musicians
Canadian women singers
Canadian singer-songwriters
Canadian performers of Christian music
Canadian Mennonites